Marlo Chandler is a fictional character appearing in American comic books published by Marvel Comics. Created by writer Peter David, she first appeared in The Incredible Hulk 2nd Volume (September 1988) and became an ongoing supporting character, first in the above mentioned book and later in the Captain Marvel series published between 1999 – 2004. She is married to Rick Jones (a perennial sidekick to the Incredible Hulk) and was a best friend to Betty Ross, the wife of Hulk's alter ego Bruce Banner. Marlo is also depicted as the human host of Lady Death.

In keeping with her introduction during a storyline in which the Hulk was involved with organized crime, Marlo's name combines the surnames of fictional detective Philip Marlowe (with the spelling changed to Marlo, a top-1000 name for girls born in the 1960s and 1970s) and his creator Raymond Chandler.

Fictional character biography
Marlo first appears as an aerobics and swimming instructor and as a love interest for the casino security enforcer "Joe Fixit", who was in reality the believed-dead Hulk living incognito. His true identity was unknown to Marlo. She leaves him after seeing him appear to commit a brutal murder but, after the Hulk reaches out to her in a rare display of emotion, their relationship ends in a more amicable way.

She later appears as the girlfriend of Rick Jones, who is Hulk's sidekick and best friend to the Hulk's alter ego Bruce Banner. She had met Rick while he was on a book tour promoting his memoir, Sidekick. It is only when Rick, not knowing of Marlo's previous relationship with the Hulk, introduces her to Bruce and Betty, that Marlo discovers that Mr. Fixit was really the Hulk, and that Bruce is not merely Mr. Fixit's friend but his alter ego.

Shortly after this introduction—Marlo assuring Betty that she has nothing to be jealous about as Bruce and Joe were two distinct people and Bruce has been unswervingly loyal to Betty—the psychiatrist Doc Samson integrates the three personalities of the Hulk (green, gray, and Banner), resulting in a being that possesses a permanent Hulk body with Bruce's face and intelligence. When Betty expresses skepticism of a continued relationship with this new version of her husband, she moves in with Marlo, with whom she becomes best friends.

Marlo is stabbed to death by Jackie Shorr, a deranged woman who claims to be Rick's biological mother. Rick eventually revives Marlo using the technology of the Hulk villain known as Leader. She does not come back all the way at first, and spends some time in a near vegetative state, only snapping out of it and regaining some form of consciousness when her brothers try to issue a court order to take her into care.

Rick and Marlo marry, although the wedding is nearly called off. At his bachelor party, Rick discovers a soft porn film that featured Marlo stripping nude at the beach, which was one of several such films she appeared in just after she had finished high school, but the couple reconciles thanks to the Hulk's intervention. Every supervillain from Kree to Mephisto appears at their wedding, due to the machinations of the Impossible Man. The two even become famous while hosting a successful talk show called Keeping up with the Joneses. During this time, they make occasional appearances in the Hulk series; Marlo and Betty Banner (wife of Bruce Banner) become close friends and live together (again) for a while until Betty's untimely death.

Marlo and Rick separate for a time, and she occupies herself with running the couple's Los Angeles-area comic book store. She and Rick reunite shortly after he is bonded with Genis-Vell the son of the original Captain Marvel, who took on that mantle himself. Soon after, Marlo is menaced by the Wendigo, a cannibalistic monster. She is saved by the Hulk. During the Captain Marvel series, Marlo becomes possessed by the personification of Death. The large amount of cosmic powers leave her with a literal death wish, which manifests itself as reality changing to suit Marlo's desires. Later, after coming to understand the situation, this talent goes away when she wishes for it to be gone.  The comic store itself often had stories featuring real-life incidents happening to Marlo and Rick. Marlo spends much of the time annoyed by a chain-smoking, female ghost only she can see and hear. This is the spirit of the girl killed during the Wendigo debacle. Marlo plays a major role in the Captain Marvel series.

At one point she develops an attraction for the superheroine Moondragon which surprises the pair. At first both were unsure of what to do and before they can explore the possibility Marlo is whisked away by her husband.  When the truth eventually comes out Rick stands aside to let Marlo and Heather figure out their feelings.  After some time passes Marlo and Heather break up when Marlo realizes that whatever feelings she had, they are stronger towards Rick. Heather, brokenheartedly, states she must have subconsciously used her telepathy to enamor Marlo. This is not true, just Heather trying to make the split easier for Marlo.

As the Captain Marvel series ended, Rick, now separated from Captain Marvel, and Marlo are last seen happily in love and giving their marriage a second chance.

Marlo goes missing for some time and is revealed to have been kidnapped by the Leader. She was turned into a new version of the Harpy by the Leader. After telepathically manipulating her, the Leader sends her to battle Bruce Banner and Skaar. Afterwards when she recognizes Rick upon regressing back from his A-Bomb form, she returns to normal and reunites with Rick.

During the World War Hulks storyline, she as Harpy helps A-Bomb fight Ulik after averting a disaster on the train tracks he destroyed. When Ulik starts to choke Marlo, she is saved by A-Bomb who defeats Ulik.

During the Chaos War storyline, Doctor Strange reveals to the Hulk and his allies that Marlo is now a crucial factor in the war. Due to her time as a host of Death, Marlo could serve as a "Death substitute" if she is discovered which would result in everyone currently merely immobilized by Hell being killed by the hellfire. Marlo soon uses her connection to Death to bring Doc Samson, Jarella, Hiroim, and Rebecca Banner back from the dead to help the Hulks in their fight against a resurrected Abomination, a Zom-possessed Doctor Strange, and the forces of Amatsu-Mikaboshi. Marlo Chandler later uses her connection to Death to free Doctor Strange from Zom and send Abomination back to the afterlife.

Marlo apparently reappears in Las Vegas some years later. to talk with Ben Reilly, the clone of Spider-Man, recently brought back to life and having spent time acting as the new Jackal, but it is soon revealed that this is actually Death, using Marlo's body to talk with Reilly due to their prior bond.

Powers and abilities
Marlo Chandler is an expert gymnast and swimmer.

For a time, Marlo possesses a "death wish" power after her time serving as host to the cosmic being known as Death, which results in her being able to unconsciously shape reality when she makes wishes, although this power only works if she is not consciously trying to use it. She eventually erases this power after she wishes that she no longer had it. It has been revealed the connection with Death can be rekindled under extreme circumstances, allowing her to access the powers of the cosmic being Mistress Death herself.

As the new Harpy, Marlo has superhuman strength and durability as well as the ability to fly and fire energy bolts from her hands.

Other versions

Ultimate Marvel 

The Ultimate Universe version of Marlo Chandler makes a brief appearance as the hostess at a Kansas diner that is visited by the Hulk and Power Princess.

In Ruins Marlo Chandler appears as a morphine addict living with Rick Jones who has gotten cancer from the gamma blast.

References

External links
 Marlo Chandler at Marvel.com
 Marlo Chandler at Marvel Wiki
 Marlo Chandler at Comic Vine
 Incredible Hulk.com Profile

Characters created by Peter David
Comics characters introduced in 1988
Fictional avatars
Fictional bisexual females
Fictional characters with superhuman durability or invulnerability
Fictional gymnasts
Fictional harpies
Fictional pornographic film actors
Marvel Comics characters who are shapeshifters
Marvel Comics LGBT characters
Marvel Comics female characters
Marvel Comics mutates
Marvel Comics characters with superhuman strength